The Pomeranian Army was one of the Polish armies defending against the 1939 Invasion of Poland. It was officially created on March 23, 1939. Led by General dywizji Władysław Bortnowski, it consisted of 5 infantry divisions, 2 National Defence brigades and 1 cavalry brigade.

Tasks
The Army was tasked to defend Toruń and Bydgoszcz from a possible German attack and to carry out delaying actions in the "Polish Corridor" area.

Operational history
The Pomorze Army suffered severe losses during the Battle of Tuchola Forest; losing about a third of its strength. In retreat towards Warsaw from September 6, it subordinated itself to Army Poznań and took part in the battle of Bzura (September 9–20).

Organization
The Army was commanded by General Władysław Bortnowski; his chief of staff was Colonel Ignacy Izdebski.

The composition of the Pomorze Army:

Maps

See also 
 Polish army order of battle in 1939

References
 Armie i samodzielne grupy operacyjne Wojska Polskiego 1939 WIEM Encyklopedia

Military units and formations of Poland in World War II
Military units and formations established in 1939
Polish armies